Zakaria Mohamed Elmabruk Alharaish (born 23 October 1998) is a Libyan international footballer who plays as a winger for USM Alger and the Libyan national team.

Club career
Alharaish started his professional career with Al Ahli from Tripoli. In July 2018, he joined Montenegrin club Sutjeska Nikšić on a year-long loan, with an option for an extension. On October 3, 2018, he scored his first goal for Sutjeska in a 3-0 win against Iskra Danilovgrad in the 2018–19 Montenegrin Cup.
In 2022, he joined USM Alger.

International career
Alharaish made his international debut for Libya at the 2017 CECAFA Cup. He was selected to Libya's squad for the 2018 African Nations Championship. He scored during his team's first game in the competition in a 3-0 win against Equatorial Guinea on January 15, 2018. He was recalled to the squad for the 2020 African Nations Championship.

References

External links

1998 births
Living people
Libyan footballers
Libya international footballers
Libyan expatriate footballers
Al-Ahli SC (Tripoli) players
FK Sutjeska Nikšić players
Ittihad Tanger players
CS Constantine players
Montenegrin First League players
Botola players
Algerian Ligue Professionnelle 1 players
Association football wingers
Libyan expatriate sportspeople in Montenegro
Libyan expatriate sportspeople in Morocco
Libyan expatriate sportspeople in Algeria
Expatriate footballers in Montenegro
Expatriate footballers in Morocco
Expatriate footballers in Algeria
Libyan Premier League players
Libya A' international footballers
2018 African Nations Championship players
2020 African Nations Championship players
2022 African Nations Championship players